TSS Holyhead Ferry I was a passenger vessel built for British Railways in 1965.

History

TSS Holyhead Ferry I was built by Hawthorn Leslie and Company, Hebburn for British Railways for the Irish Sea crossing between Holyhead and Dun Laoghaire and Dublin.

In 1976 she was rebuilt by Swan Hunter on the River Tyne which increased her car capacity from 150 to 205, but reduced the passenger capacity to 725. She was renamed Earl Leofric. In 1979 she fell under the control of the British Railways subsidiary company Sealink UK Ltd.

She was scrapped in June 1981 at San Esteban de Pravia, Spain.

References

1965 ships
Passenger ships of the United Kingdom
Steamships of the United Kingdom
Ships built on the River Tyne
Ships of British Rail